Nanchang Metro Line 2 (also known as Nanchang Rail Transit Line 2 in official documents) is a rapid transit line in Nanchang, from Nanlu to Xinjia'an. The line is 31.51 km in length with 28 stations.

The section from Nanlu to Metro Central (19.63 km) opened on 18 August 2017. The section from Metro Central to Xinjia'an (11.88 km) opened on 30 June 2019.

Opening timeline

Map

Stations

Rolling stock
The line is operated with Type B rolling stock with a maximum speed of 80 km/h. 22 trains of 6-car set, 132 cars in total will be operated at the first stage. These cars are 2.8 m in width, 3.8 m in height and 19 m in length, providing the system with a maximum capacity of 30,000 to 55,000 passengers per hour in each direction, and a minimum service interval of 2 minutes.

History
The construction of Phase 1 started in July 2013.

In the initial plan of 2008, Line 2 spans from Luojia Town in the east to Wangcheng in the west, and is 39 km in length in the long-term plan. Its Phase 1 starts from Nanchang West railway station to Hongdu Zhong Dadao, which was extended to Xinjia'an to the east in the end of 2010 and then extended further south to Jiulonghu in early 2013.

References

02
Railway lines opened in 2017